Narayan Peth is an old neighbourhood located in the city of Pune, India. The name is derived from the name of Narayanrao Peshwa. Lokmanya Tilak's Kesari Wada is in Narayan Peth.

References

Peths in Pune